Anvari (Persian: انورى) is an Iranian surname that may refer to
Abbas Anvari, Iranian physicist 
Abolfazl Anvari (1938–2018), Iranian freestyle wrestler
Babak Anvari, Iranian filmmaker 
Hossein Ali Anvari, Iranian electrical engineer
Kiarash Anvari (born 1977), Iranian filmmaker, video artist and script writer 

Persian-language surnames